Aberbran railway station served the village of Aberbran in the traditional county of Brecknockshire, Wales.

History

Opened by the Neath and Brecon Railway, it became part of the Great Western Railway during the Grouping of 1923. The line then passed on to the Western Region of British Railways on nationalisation in 1948. It was then closed by the British Transport Commission.

The site today

The site is now a touring caravan park owned and operated by the Caravan Club.

References

External links
 Campsite volunteer co-ordinator given framed ticket 
Caravan Club page on site now 
 Aberbran station on navigable O. S. map

Disused railway stations in Powys
Railway stations in Great Britain opened in 1868
Railway stations in Great Britain closed in 1962
Former Great Western Railway stations